Darryl Brown (born 25 March 1983) is a South African cricketer. He was included in the Border cricket team for the 2015 Africa T20 Cup.

References

External links
 

1983 births
Living people
South African cricketers
Border cricketers